Voyager is a progressive metal band from Perth, Western Australia, formed in 1999. The band has released seven full-length albums. Their seventh full-length studio album, Colours in the Sun, was released worldwide on 1 November 2019 on the French American metal record label Season of Mist. They will represent Australia in the Eurovision Song Contest 2023 with the song "Promise".

History

1999–2003: Formation and Element V 
Voyager formed in 1999 at the University of Western Australia by Daniel Estrin, Mark Baker, and Adam Lovkis. The band saw a few lineup changes before recording the album Element V in 2003 with Aidan Barton at Sovereign Studios, Willetton, Western Australia. The lineup for Element V consisted of Daniel Estrin (keyboards, vocals), Mark De Vattimo (guitar), Jennah Graieg (bass), Geoff Callaghan (drums) and Emanuel Rudnicki (guitar), in 2002.

The album Element V was released in Australia in 2003, and then picked up by Dutch label DVS Records and released in Europe the following year. Japanese label Woodbell/Experience licensed the album for Japanese distribution in the same year and released it with a bonus track, "Now and Forever".

Voyager's popularity increased rapidly following the European release of Element V and the band secured its first major support, opening for Steve Vai in Perth in July 2004.

After the release of Element V, Melissa Fiocco replaced Jennah on bass. Voyager performed at Melbourne's Corner Hotel in late 2005 as part of a Screaming Symphony radio benefit concert, playing for the first time out of their home state of Western Australia. Towards the end of 2006, Emanuel and Geoff departed the band and were replaced by Simone Dow and Mark Boeijen respectively, just prior to the recording of the follow up album, uniVers.

2006–2007: UniVers and ProgPower Europe 
In early 2006, Voyager entered Sovereign studios to record "uniVers", with Boeijen and Dow as firm members of the band. Voyager shot a video clip to the radio edit version of the song "Sober" and released this as a limited edition single in 2006.

The band performed at the ProgPower Europe Festival in the Netherlands in 2006 and received positive responses from the media. As a result of this performance, Voyager were invited to ProgPower UK in 2008. In late 2006, Voyager were due to perform with Nevermore, whose Perth leg of the show was ultimately cancelled. Voyager were also due to support Yngwie Malmsteen following their return from the first European Tour, but were struck from the show at the last minute because Malmsteen did not want any support acts for his Australian tour.

In early 2007, DVS Records announced its closure and Voyager had no label to release their album uniVers, which was fully recorded at that stage.

In October 2007, the band signed to German label Dockyard 1 Records in Hamburg, who released uniVers worldwide, with the USA receiving the album for distribution in January 2008 through Locomotive Records. uniVers received critical acclaim throughout the world, being voted album of the month by Belgium's Mindview magazine and album of the week in Finland's Imperiumi magazine. It was named as #7 of the Full Metal Racket albums of 2007 by Australia's national alternative broadcasting station Triple J. The band was nominated in the Top 10 of the MusicOz Awards.

The band parted ways with bass player Melissa Fiocco shortly after the release of uniVers, a split which was not without controversy. Fiocco was replaced by Alex Canion, who was 18 years old. Shortly after Canion's first appearance with Voyager in Perth, Western Australia, the band embarked on a mini-tour to Sydney and Melbourne with labelmates Eyefear, to promote uniVers.

In January 2008, Voyager performed with Nightwish in Perth. The band's scheduled Australian tour with Toto in March 2008 was cancelled, apparently due to Toto's stage requirements. In late February 2008, ProgPower UK was also cancelled due to poor ticket sales.

Voyager indicated that they would continue their European tour of Denmark, Netherlands, Germany and Switzerland in spite of the cancellation. Their tour included a performance with 1980s arena rock band House of Lords at the Ballroom Hamburg.

In June 2008, guitarist Mark De Vattimo quit Voyager due to personal and musical differences.

Voyager performed together with Queensrÿche in August 2009 and with Deathstars from Sweden in September 2009.

2009–2011: I Am the Revolution 
After recording new songs with Adam Round at Kingdom Studios in Maylands, Western Australia and having the tracks mastered by Sterling Sound in New York City, Voyager released their album I Am the ReVolution on 20 September 2009 through Dockyard 1 Records in Germany and Riot Entertainment in Australia. The album was immediately received with critical acclaim, including the popular Vampster website, although some critics were skeptical about the band's strong melodic influences and their "pop" sound.

The album was named album of the week by Romania's MetalFan website and the song "Total Existence Failure" picked up the Song of the Year from the West Australian Music Industry Awards.

Voyager released a new video for the song "The Devil in Me" in October 2009.

In 2010, Voyager was nominated three times as a top 10 finalist at the Australian MusicOz Awards for "Lost", "The Devil in Me" and the video for the latter. The band also picked up a nomination for 2010 WAMI "Best hard rock/metal act" presented by the West Australian Music Industry.

Chris Hanssen and Voyager parted ways in 2010, with Scott Kay taking over guitar duties. Kay's first tour was with Scottish pirate metal band Alestorm in May 2011, during which the band received critical acclaim.

2011–2013: The Meaning of I
After recording new songs in April/May 2011, Voyager signed a deal with New Jersey-based label Sensory. In October 2011 the band released The Meaning of I. The album is the first to feature new guitarist Scott Kay and the last to feature Mark Boeijen on drums who left shortly after the recording to focus on his family. The album features guest vocal performances by DC Cooper (Royal Hunt) and Daniel Tompkins (Tesseract, ex-Skyharbor). It was released worldwide on 11 October 2011, but was released early in the US at the ProgPower festival in September 2011.

Voyager were also announced for a show with Creation's End in Brooklyn on 11 September 2011. After returning from the US, Voyager toured with popular Finnish metal band Children of Bodom.

Voyager was one of the opening bands for Epica when they played in Perth on 23 April 2013.

2013–2017: V
At the end of 2013, Voyager unveiled a crowdfunding campaign for their album V and unveiled clips of pre-production recordings of new songs. The campaign's goal was reached within three days of its launch. "Breaking Down" was the first single from the album.

In May 2015, Voyager toured nationally, supported by French progressive rock band Klone. They returned to North America in September for the US ProgPower event and a national tour.

2017–2019: Ghost Mile
Ghost Mile was released on 12 May 2017.

2019–present: Colours in the Sun and Eurovision Song Contest
On September 21, 2018 Voyager performed at the o2 Indigo, London, UK as part of the European Space Agency's Space Rocks exhibition/concert, giving them the chance to play "Colours" and "Brightstar" from the forthcoming album. They also performed at the 229 the following evening as part of a short seven date European tour.

Voyager were shortlisted to the Australian national final for the Eurovision Song Contest 2020 with "Runaway", but were ultimately not chosen as one of the ten acts to compete in the final of the selection.

The band were selected to take part in the Australian national selection for the Eurovision Song Contest 2022, Eurovision - Australia Decides, in 2022. They placed second with "Dreamer". Following its performance on Eurovision - Australia Decides, "Dreamer" debuted at number 6 on the Australian Independent Label Singles chart.

On 21 February 2023, it was announced that Voyager were internally selected to represent Australia in the Eurovision Song Contest 2023 with the song "Promise". The band is the first group to represent the country. "Promise" debuted at number 3 on the Australian Independent Label Singles chart.

Band members

Timeline

Endorsements
The following members of Voyager currently have instrument endorsements:

 Danny – KORG/Musiclink Australia, DSL straps
 Simone – Mesa Boogie, Music Man Guitars, Ernie Ball strings
 Scott  – Mayones Guitars, Ernie Ball strings
 Alex – David Eden amps, Ernie Ball strings, Mayones Bass guitars
 Ashley Doodkorte – Tama drums, Sabian cymbals

Discography

Studio albums

References

External links 

 Official Voyager page

Musical groups established in 1999
Musical groups from Perth, Western Australia
Australian progressive metal musical groups
1999 establishments in Australia
Eurovision Song Contest entrants of 2023
Eurovision Song Contest entrants for Australia